There have been several seasons of drought in Afghanistan in recent decades. According to an analysis of climate and drought records Asia Development Bank, localized droughts have a periodicity of three to five years, and droughts covering large areas recur every 9-11 years. South and central areas are more affected from July through September. 
 
Afghanistan began experiencing unusual droughts beginning in 1995, right after the Taliban emerged. It remained this way until heavy snow began falling in the 2002-2003 winter season, after the new Karzai administration took over. This relief did not last long as the country began to see more droughts in the coming years.

Drought combined with conflict has created internally displaced populations that are living in extremely poor conditions. Many communities continue to depend on meager incomes derived by migrating outside their farmlands. Inadequate rains and snowfall during 2008 to 2010 in parts of Afghanistan caused significant failure of the rain-fed crops in the country's six provinces: Herat, Jawzjan, Balkh, Badghis, Faryab and Sar-e-Pul. The situation affected the most vulnerable populations and their access to food and water, reducing communities' health and nutrition status. However, in 2012 Afghanistan's long drought has ended due to heavy snow.

See
 Environmental issues in Afghanistan
 Water supply in Afghanistan

References

External links 
 Afghanistan: Severe Drought Causes Major Decline in 2008/09 Wheat Production

Climate of Afghanistan
Environment of Afghanistan
Natural disasters in Afghanistan
Afghanistan
Afghanistan